The 1984–85 Yorkshire Cup was the seventy-seventh occasion on which the  Yorkshire Cup competition had been held. This season there were no junior/amateur clubs taking part, no new entrants and no "leavers" and so the total of entries remained the  same at sixteen. In this year's final, Hull F.C. beat close neighbours and fierce rivals Hull Kingston Rovers by the score of 29-12. The match was played at Boothferry Park, Kingston upon Hull. The city was formally in the East Riding of Yorkshire, followed by Humberside and is now (back) in the ceremonial county of the East Riding of Yorkshire. It was moved to this stadium from  the provisionally reserved venue due to the  interest showed by fans and after requests by both finalists, and the  organisers were rewarded with a crowd of 25,237 and gate receipts more than doubled from last year's £33,572 to £68,639. This is only the third meeting of these two clubs in the Yorkshire Cup final, on the two previous occasions Hull Kingston Rovers defeated Hull FC, in 1920-21 by 2-0 and 1967 by 8-7; this time it was revenge and by a wider margin. This is the third successive Yorkshire Cup final victory for Hull F.C. And the  first of two successive Final appearances by Hull Kingston Rovers

Background 
The Rugby League Yorkshire Cup competition was a knock-out competition between (mainly professional) rugby league clubs from  the  county of Yorkshire. The actual area was at times increased to encompass other teams from  outside the  county such as Newcastle, Mansfield, Coventry, and even London (in the form of Acton & Willesden).

The Rugby League season always (until the onset of "Summer Rugby" in 1996) ran from around August-time through to around May-time and this competition always took place early in the season, in the Autumn, with the final taking place in (or just before) December (The only exception to this was when disruption of the fixture list was caused during, and immediately after, the two World Wars).

Competition and results

Round 1 
Involved  8 matches and 16 clubs

Round 2 - Quarter-finals 
Involved 4 matches and 8 clubs

Round 3 – Semi-finals  
Involved 2 matches and 4 clubs

Final

Teams and scorers 

Scoring - Try = four points - Goal = two points - Drop goal = one point

The road to success

Notes and comments 
1 * This is the first Yorkshire Cup match played by the newly renamed Huddersfield Barracudas and also since Fartown was renamed as  Arena 84

2 * This was the  first Yorkshire Cup tie in which one of the  teams scored a single point.

3 * The attendance is given as 10,477 by RUGBYLEAGUEproject  but the official Hull F.C. archives give the  attendance as 10,775

4 * Boothferry Park was the home ground of Hull City from 31 August 1946 until December 2002. The final capacity was 15,160 although the record attendance was 55,019 set on 26 February 1949 in an FA Cup quarter-final when Hull City played host to Manchester United

See also 
1984–85 Rugby Football League season
Rugby league county cups

References

External links
Saints Heritage Society
1896–97 Northern Rugby Football Union season at wigan.rlfans.com 
Hull&Proud Fixtures & Results 1896/1897
Widnes Vikings - One team, one passion Season In Review - 1896-97
The Northern Union at warringtonwolves.org

RFL Yorkshire Cup
Yorkshire Cup